Oldham East was a parliamentary constituency centred on the town of Oldham in the north-east of Greater Manchester. It returned one Member of Parliament (MP)  to the House of Commons of the Parliament of the United Kingdom.

The constituency was created at the 1950 general election, succeeding the former two-seat Oldham constituency, and was abolished at the 1983 general election. The constituency since 1997 is Oldham East and Saddleworth (UK Parliament constituency).

Boundaries

1950–1955: The County Borough of Oldham wards of Clarksfield, Mumps, St James', St Mary's, St Paul's, St Peter's, and Waterhead, and the Urban District of Lees.

1955–1983: As above plus Bardsley ward.

Members of Parliament

Elections

Elections in the 1950s

Elections in the 1960s

Elections in the 1970s

References

Parliamentary constituencies in North West England (historic)
Constituencies of the Parliament of the United Kingdom established in 1950
Constituencies of the Parliament of the United Kingdom disestablished in 1983
Politics of the Metropolitan Borough of Oldham